Steven Stalinsky is an expert on the Middle East, terrorism,  terrorist use of the Internet, and encryption technologies. He has served as Executive Director of the Middle East Media Research Institute (MEMRI) since 1999. Since 2006, his research has focused on detailing and developing strategies against cyber jihad, describing how terrorist groups such as Al-Qaeda, ISIS, and others use the Internet, social media, and encryption for propaganda, recruiting, and hacking. He was an early advocate of calling on the tech community to take stronger action on removing terrorist content from their platforms and for creating industry standards to combat it.

Research on terrorist use of social media 

Stalinsky has published extensive research and documentation of the use of Facebook, YouTube, Twitter, Tumblr and other social media by Al-Qaeda and ISIS. He has been interviewed about terrorist use of social media by Fox News, The Washington Post, The Telegraph, the South China Morning Post, The Washington Times, The Mercury News, The Hill, WIRED, and The Daily Telegraph.

Vice's social media website, Motherboard, reported on MEMRI research co-authored by Stalinsky. Stalinsky was credited by Fast Company with publishing "one of the only studies to date" on how Jihadists use the social media service Instagram. In the article, Stalinsky noted that much of this content also appeared on other corners of the Internet and was shared via other forms of social media. Stalinsky was one of the first to write about terrorist use of the encrypted messaging app Telegram in his research report, 'Supporters of the Islamic State' – Anatomy Of A Private Jihadi Group On Encrypted App Telegram. He also debated the issue with the app's founder, Pavel Durov, via Twitter. Stalinsky has been interviewed numerous times about his research on terrorist use of Telegram, VK and encryption, including articles from The Wall Street Journal, The Washington Post, The Washington Times, Voice of America, The Hill, SCmagazine.com, CNN, NBC, The Jerusalem Post, The Los Angeles Times, Discovery, FedScoop, The Dallas Morning News, Homeland Security Today, Wired, CBS, Business Insider and others.

Stalinsky's research on Al-Qaeda's online magazine Inspire was cited in a U.S. Department of Justice terrorism case. The U.S. government used translations and analysis quoted in Stalinsky's research as Exhibit 1 to answer a lawsuit by the father of Anwar Al-Awlaki, who petitioned President Barack Obama, Secretary of Defense Robert Gates and CIA Director Leon Panetta,  seeking his son's removal from the U.S. government's "kill list."

In 2013 and 2014, several media organizations used Stalinsky's research describing the indoctrination and exploitation of young children by Al-Qaeda and other Jihadist groups. A Voice of America article quoted Stalinsky, "There is a concerted effort by Al-Qaeda central and splinter groups – greater than ever – to concentrate on children. Al-Qaeda has realized that this is an effective way for the group to spread its ideology and grow."[ A Washington Post article included Stalinsky's research, quoting him, "This is the future threat... These are the children of Al-Qaeda." Fox News also reported on the issue and included his research.

Research for the Middle East Media Research Institute 
Mr. Stalinsky has authored over 100 (nonacademic) research reports while at the Middle East Media Research Institute, on issues ranging from reform in the Arab world to online activity by Al-Qaeda, ISIS, the Taliban and other terrorist organizations, as well as their use of encryption technology. Other research reports detailed terrorist use of U.S.-based libraries such as the Internet Archive, Arab and Iranian hacking groups and more. He was one of the first to write about Jihadism's use of social media, including YouTube, Twitter and Telegram, with a series of research reports on specific terrorist activity, such as Hezbullah's presence on Facebook, YouTube, Twitter and apps from Google Play and iTunes. He also reported on the thousands of YouTube videos – with over 3 million views at that time – featuring extremist Yemeni-American sheikh Anwar Al-Awlaki . Stalinsky led early efforts to persuade YouTube to add a feature to flag terrorist content, and one of his reports documented his 2010 meeting with Google officials on this matter. Another report detailed his years of effort to prompt Twitter to take action about Jihadis' use of their social networking service – efforts which culminated in a 2013 Congressional letter to the FBI urging them to take action.

Stalinsky authored a report for the Middle East Media Research Institute (MEMRI) titled, "Will President-Elect Trump Defeat Cyber Jihad?" The report describes how Islamic terrorists use social media and the Internet for recruitment, fundraising, planning and propaganda, and calls on the Trump administration to address the issue. It calls on the Trump administration to bring together technology experts and researchers in a Bletchley Park like setting and urges the government to be forward thinking on the issue.

Chronicling Al-Qaeda leader Adam Gadahn 
Stalinsky first wrote about Gadahn on September 13, 2006, when the New York Sun published, “A Jewish Musician's Son Joins Al Qaeda's Ranks,” by Stalinsky. The op-ed provides details of the life of Adam Gadahn (born Pearlman), the American who left his home in California to join the ranks of Al-Qaeda. Gadahn was put on the FBI's Most Wanted list in 2004, reportedly received training at terrorist camps in Afghanistan and was sent to Baltimore on a suicide-bombing mission. The op-ed notes Gadahn's appearances in several Al-Qaeda media productions, including his formal introduction in a September 2, 2006 video by then-Al-Qaeda second-in-command Ayman Al-Zawahiri.

After the United States Government announced it had killed Gadahn in a drone attack, Stalinsky wrote “Why Adam Gadahn’s Killing Matters to Al Qaeda,” which was published in Homeland Security Today on May 19, 2015. The op-ed discusses the significance of Adam Gadahn's death to Al-Qaeda, and his role as part of the organization's media outreach efforts to the Western world. Stalinsky notes that Gadahn was one of the few people remaining in contact with Al-Qaeda leader Osama bin Laden. Stalinsky also points out that, as an Al-Qaeda propagandist, Gadahn's story could resonate with susceptible populations in the United States and other Western countries, and expand the organization's effort to reach a broader audience.

A longer version of the article "Why Adam Gadahn's Killing Matters to Al Qaeda" appeared as MEMRI Daily Brief 45 on the website of MEMRI on April 24, 2015. On the one-year anniversary of Gadahn's death, Stalinsky wrote, “Revisiting American Al-Qaeda Spokesman And Leader Adam Gadahn's Influence On The First Anniversary Of His Death."  Stalinsky also authored a report published on September 8, 2016, "Al-Qaeda's U.S.-Born Leader Adam Gadahn and 9/11" that includes a very detailed report on Al-Qaeda's American spokesman Adam Gadahn.

Stalinsky's book about Adam Gadahn, AMERICAN TRAITOR: The rise and fall of Al-Qaeda's U.S.-Born Leader Adam Gadahn, provides detailed background on Gadahn's life story, including his American upbringing, his conversion to Islam and subsequent radicalization, his move to Pakistan, the translation and video work he did for Al-Qaeda, and how he became accepted by Al-Qaeda's top echelons - including the architects of the September 11 attacks. Gadahn was the first American since WWII to be indicted for treason by the U.S. Government. In writing the book, Stalinsky had access to research from the Middle East Media Research Institute (MEMRI), including videos featuring Gadahn and a lengthy interview Gadahn made for publication after his death.

Research on terrorist use of drones 
Stalinsky co-authored a major study for MEMRI on the Islamic State of Iraq and the Levant’s  and other Jihadi organizations use of drones that has been cited by many media outlets. The Washington Post subsequently interviewed Stalinsky for an article on how ISIS [Islamic State] uses Unmanned aerial vehicle. The website TheStreet.com interviewed Stalinsky for an article about ISIS and drones. The website MeriTalk.com quoted Stalinsky for an article on ISIS and UAVs. A Discover article draws on a report authored by Stalinsky.

See also
 MEMRI
 Hezbollah
 Islamic terrorism

References

External links
 Articles.washingtonpost.com

Living people
American nonprofit executives
American non-fiction writers
Year of birth missing (living people)
Place of birth missing (living people)